The Calgary Wranglers were a junior ice hockey team that played in the Western Hockey League from 1977 until 1987. The Wranglers played their home games in Calgary, Alberta, Canada, at the Stampede Corral.

History
The previous Calgary WHL (at that time called the Western Canada Hockey League, or WCHL) franchise, the Calgary Centennials, had moved south to become the Billings Bighorns shortly after the end of the 1976–77 WCHL season. A new investor group bought the existing Winnipeg Monarchs franchise and relocated them to Calgary before the start of the 1977–78 WCHL season.  They would last 10 years in Calgary before relocating again to Lethbridge, Alberta, becoming the Hurricanes. After 35 years, the Wranglers name was revived when the Calgary Flames re-located their American Hockey League affiliate to the Scotiabank Saddledome and re-named them after the old team.

Season-by-season record

Note: GP = Games played, W = Wins, L = Losses, T = Ties Pts = Points, GF = Goals for, GA = Goals against

NHL alumni

Darrell Anholt
Murray Brumwell
Len Barrie
Dan Bourbonnais
Colin Chisholm
Ray Cote
Mark Greig
Mike Heidt
Doug Houda
Trent Kaese
Darin Kimble
Kelly Kisio
Ross McKay
Dana Murzyn
Jim Playfair
Ken Quinney
Warren Skorodenski
Randy Smith
Mark Tinordi
Brian Tutt
Mike Vernon
Leigh Verstraete
Bob Wilkie
Carey Wilson
Mike Zanier

See also
List of ice hockey teams in Alberta
Ice hockey in Calgary

References

External links
 Western Hockey League website

Defunct ice hockey teams in Alberta
Wranglers, Calgary
Ice hockey clubs established in 1977
Defunct Western Hockey League teams
1977 establishments in Alberta
1987 disestablishments in Alberta
Ice hockey clubs disestablished in 1987